Tawhidul Alam Sabuz is a Bangladeshi footballer who plays as a forward. He currently plays for Bashundhara Kings in Bangladesh Premier League

International goals
Olympic Team

Senior National Team

Bashundhara Kings

References 

1990 births
Living people
Bangladeshi footballers
Bangladesh international footballers
Mohammedan SC (Dhaka) players
Farashganj SC players
Sheikh Jamal Dhanmondi Club players
Abahani Limited (Chittagong) players
Association football forwards
Bashundhara Kings players
Footballers at the 2010 Asian Games
Asian Games competitors for Bangladesh
South Asian Games gold medalists for Bangladesh
South Asian Games medalists in football